The 2022 Asia Cup Final was the final of the 2022 Asia Cup, a Twenty20 International cricket tournament, played between Pakistan and Sri Lanka on 11 September 2022 in Dubai. India were the defending champions, and were eliminated in the Super Four stage. Sri Lanka beat Pakistan by 23 runs to win their sixth title.

Background
The qualifier tournament had been postponed in July 2020. In May 2021, the ACC confirmed that there would be no Asia Cup in 2021, with that edition of the tournament deferred until 2023. In October 2021, following a meeting with the ACC, Ramiz Raja confirmed that Pakistan would host the following tournament in 2023, with Sri Lanka hosting the 2022 edition. A qualification tournament was played in August 2022.

On 17 July 2022, due to the economic crisis in Sri Lanka and mass protests across the country, the Secretary of SLC Mohan de Silva stated that the tournament will be hosted in the United Arab Emirates.

Road to the final

Match

Match officials
 On-field umpires: Anil Chaudhary (India)  and Masudur Rahman  (Bangladesh)
 Third umpire: Bismillah Jan Shinwari (Afghanistan)
 Reserve umpire: Jayaraman Madanagopal (India)
 Match referee: Andy Pycroft (Zimbabwe)
 Toss: Pakistan won the toss and elected to field.

Summary

Scorecard

Fall of wickets: 2/1 (K. Mendis, 0.3 ov), 23/2 (P. Nissanka, 3.2 ov), 36/3 (D. Gunathilaka, 5.1 ov), 53/4 (D. de Silva, 7.4 ov), 58/5 (D. Shanaka, 8.5 ov), 116/6 (W. Hasaranga, 14.5 ov)

Fall of wickets: 22/1 (B. Azam, 3.2 ov), 22/2 (F. Zaman, 3.3 ov), 93/3 (I. Ahmed, 13.2 ov), 102/4 (M. Nawaz, 15.2 ov), 110/5 (M. Rizwan, 16.1 ov), 111/6 (A. Ali, 16.3 ov), 112/7 (K. Shah, 16.5 ov), 120/8 (S. Khan, 17.6 ov) 125/9 (N. Shah, 18.2 ov), 147/10 (H. Rauf, 19.6 ov)

References

Asia Cup Final
Asia Cup
Asia Cup Final
Limited overs cricket matches
2022 in the United Arab Emirates